Haven is a fictional town on the Maine coast, which is the center of events in the supernatural TV series Haven. (There is however, a town in Knox county Maine called North Haven, Maine)  It is not far by boat to Camden (placing it in either Waldo or Knox counties) and the police send forensic material to Bangor (although, the state's only forensic lab is actually in Augusta). Images of Haven are mainly derived from the town of Lunenburg, Nova Scotia, which is one of the main locations where the series is filmed, along with the village of Chester, Nova Scotia, which provides many of the shop fronts used in the series.

Haven is a coastal town with a long past connected to the sea, stretching back over 350 years to the time of the Pilgrims. People who were cast out of Europe "were given a second chance" in Haven. "People came to this town because it had [properties that neutralized] whatever curse or phenomenon that was afflicting them." The town's name is derived from the translation of a Mi'kmaq name, Tuwiuwok, meaning "Haven for God's Orphans". However, throughout the town's past there have been outbreaks of strange events that the locals refer to as The Troubles, when those curses and other strange phenomena are not held under control.

The town folk are a tightly knit group in the sense that they don't warm to strangers easily and keep their business to themselves, including information about The Troubles. However, the community is divided. On one side there are those people with supernatural afflictions, the Troubled, and those who accept them. On the other are those who see the Troubled as accursed.

Locations in Haven
According to the map of Haven seen in episode 13, "Spirals", the town is on a neck of land reaching east from the Maine coast. The southern side is the port, which looks uncannily like the port of Lunenburg. On the southern side of Haven Harbor is Tuwiuwok Bluff, from where Jonas Lester was blown by unnatural winds in the series premiere. To the north are several islands including King's, Shepherd's and Segan's Islands. To the east the neck divides in two with a smaller part to the north-east and a larger part to the south-east. The larger part is where Haven Beach is found.

The police station
Frequently seen in the series is the Haven Police Station, a three-story red brick building which looks a dead ringer for the Lunenburg Town Hall. The building has a northern and a southern entrance, though only the southern entrance is ever shown. It is here where much of the show's police research is done.

The Grey Gull
Another prominent location is Duke Crocker's restaurant, the Grey Gull. This building seems remarkably like one at Tilley's Cove on the south-west side of St. Margarets Bay, Nova Scotia located at (GPS 44.536868, -64.021544). The locale is already a restaurant called the Second Chance Bistro in Season 1's fourth episode, where it is owned by the McShaw brothers. Because of his Trouble, Bill McShaw sells the restaurant to Duke, who reopens it as the Grey Gull. In the third episode of Season 2, Audrey Parker moves into the rooms above the Grey Gull.

The Good Shepherd Church
Haven's church is on Witcham Street. In appearance it is just like St. Luke's Anglican Church, Hubbards, Nova Scotia. Ed Driscoll was the preacher there. The church is on a rise and featured a sculpture outside with a giant ball at its center. In the second episode ("Butterfly") of Season 1 the ball separated itself and rolled down the hill, crashing into the Rust Bucket, a Haven eatery. The Good Shepherd can be seen in the Season 2 opening credits sequence, where a funeral service has just been held. The church can be seen at 10 Shore Club Rd, Hubbards, NS B0J 1T0, Canada

The Haven Herald
The Haven Herald building is the working home of the Teagues brothers, Vince (Richard Donat) and Dave (John Dunsworth). It appears to be the spitting image of the building at 54 Queen Street, Chester, Nova Scotia.

The port
Haven's port is glimpsed frequently throughout the series. Its similarity with Lunenburg's port is unmistakable. It is at the eastern end of the port that Duke Crocker's fishing boat, the Cape Rouge, is moored. (The boat features the words "Ryan Atlantic II" on the stern.)

The lighthouse
The show has shown two different lighthouses. One, which is at the end of a breakwater, appears to be the Lunenburg lighthouse, while the other, which sits on a bare rocky promontory, looks like Peggy's Cove lighthouse. The promontory lighthouse is seen at the beginning of the opening credits sequence and was featured at the end of episode 5 of Season 1. The breakwater lighthouse is seen at the end of the opening credits sequence and was shown crumbling during episode 13 of Season 1, due to Chief Garland Wuornos's Trouble, which caused cracking and eventual destruction when the Chief lost control. The same lighthouse is again destroyed in episode 13 of Season 3, this time struck by a falling meteor and again in episode 1 of Season 5.

The Barn
The Barn is a mysterious structure that little is known about, except that both Sarah and Lucy went into it and did not return for twenty-seven years, with no memory of the past. It appears very much like an old barn in Robinson's Corner, Nova Scotia. Very near Chester. The exact address of The Barn is 4488 Lighthouse Rte., Chester Basin, NS B0J 1K0

Other appearances

The fictional town of Haven, Maine, was also the location of Stephen King's 1987 novel The Tommyknockers and the 1993 eponymous miniseries based on it.

References

External links
Show Me Lunenburg, Nova Scotia
The Lunenburg Town Hall
Peggy's Point lighthouse
Battery Point lighthouse, Lunenburg
St Luke's, Hubbards

 
Fictional populated places in Maine
Fictional elements introduced in 2010